The Cook Mountain Formation is a geologic formation in Alabama. It preserves fossils dating back to the Paleogene period.

See also
 List of fossiliferous stratigraphic units in Alabama
 Paleontology in Alabama

References

 

Paleogene Alabama
Paleogene Louisiana
Paleogene Mississippi
Paleogene geology of Texas